Magey Hithakee Hitheh Noon Hey? is a 2010 Maldivian romantic drama series written and directed by Shareefa Fakhri. Produced by Suneetha Ali under SSA Production, the film stars Amira Ismail and Nadhiya Hassan as two cousins who fall in love with the same man, played by Ali Ahmed.

Premise

Part one
At a very young age, Sameera's (Amira Ismail) parent pass away and she was raised by her beholden aunt, Saleema (Fauziyya Hassan) whose only child, Salma (Nadhiya Hassan) is living in Male' to complete her higher education. Sameera falls deeply in love with Mohamed (Ali Ahmed) who returns to the island after a long break. Similarly, Mohamed becomes romantically attracted to Sameera though Salma (Nadhiya Hassan) tries getting closer to him. Observing his change in his behavior, Mohamed's parents inquired about his love life, to which Mohamed shares his plans to marry Salma, where his mother, Rasheedha outright rejects it since Sameera is an underprivileged orphan.

Part two
Salma secures a job as a nurse in the island's hospital. Unaware of Rasheedha's dissent towards their relationship, Sameera continues dating Mohamed until her aunt finds out about them. Wishing all the happiness to her child, Rasheedha changes her mind and takes Mohamed's wedding proposal to Saleema which breaks Salma's heart who intends to propose to Mohamed on his birthday.

Part three
Salma hides her affection but starts throwing shade at Sameera. Mohamed and Sameera marry and lives a happy life with their new born child.

Part four
Unable to find a decent job from the island, the family struggles with their financial limitation which creates lot of troubles with their parents. Desperate for an income source, Mohamed decides to go sailing for one year, which Sameera initially dismisses fearing his fate to be the same as of her father. Mohamed gets hold of a love letter written by Salma which was subjected to him.

Part five
Saleema becomes extremely sick and Sameera suggests she retires from her job to which Salma shares her concern. A year later, Mohamed makes an unexpected return.

Cast 
 Ali Ahmed as Mohamed Hameed
 Amira Ismail as Sameera
 Nadhiya Hassan as Salma
 Roanu Hassan Manik as Abdulla Hameed
 Fauziyya Hassan as Saleema
 Sameera Ahmed as Saadhuna
 Latheefa as Rasheedha
 Waheedha

Soundtrack

References

Serial drama television series
Maldivian television shows